William A. Jacobson is an American lawyer, Cornell Law School professor, and conservative blogger.

Education
Jacobson is a 1981 summa cum laude graduate of Hamilton College. He received his J.D. degree in 1984 from Harvard Law School. During his time at Harvard Law School, Jacobson served as Senior Editor of the Harvard International Law Journal, for which he wrote a Case Comment entitled "Process Due Resident Aliens Upon Entering the United  States," 24 Harv. Int’l Law J. 198, and as Director of Litigation for the Harvard Prison Legal Assistance Project.

Career

Early career 

From 1984 to 1993, Jacobson practiced litigation with Cahill Gordon & Reindel and with Miller & Wrubel in New York City. From 1993 to 2007, he was a litigator in Providence, Rhode Island, with a civil litigation and arbitration practice. His work was focused around investment, employment, and business disputes in the securities industry.

Cornell Law School 

In 2007, Jacobson joined Cornell Law School as a Clinical Professor of Law.  He is also the Director of the law school's Securities Law Clinic, which provides legal services to small investors in upstate New York who have been the victims of investment fraud.

Legal Insurrection 

Jacobson is author of the conservative law blog, Legal Insurrection, which was founded in 2008. As of July 2014, the TaxProf blog ranked Legal Insurrection as the third most visited blog run by a law professor for the year prior. As of January 2011, Legal Insurrection was ranked number 24 in politics, and number 67 overall, by Technorati, and number 7 for top legal blogs by Avvo.

Author

Jacobson is co-author of the Securities Arbitration Desk Reference (Thomson-Reuters).

Jacobson is a conservative pundit, writing for a variety of outlets. He is a contributor to Politicos "Arena".

Activities

Elizabeth Warren 

During Senator Elizabeth Warren's 2012 U.S. Senate campaign against Republican Scott Brown, Jacobson criticized Warren's claim that she was 1/32nd Cherokee Indian.

Israel and Boycott, Divestment, Sanctions (BDS) 

Jacobson has lobbied against the BDS movement. He has participated in numerous speaking engagements on the matter, most notably events at Harvard Law School (hosted by the Committee for Accuracy in Middle East Reporting in America (CAMERA) in association with Alliance for Israel), Cornell University (sponsored by Cornellians For Israel), Children of Jewish Holocaust Survivors, and the Florida Region of CAMERA.

When Palestinian activist Bassem Tamimi spoke to third graders at an elementary school in Ithaca, New York, in 2015, Jacobson covered the event on his blog. Jacobson filed a Freedom of Information Law request with the Ithaca City School District (ICSD) to further investigate the circumstances surrounding the speaking event. After a year-long court battle with the ICSD demanding that the ICSD remove extensive redactions in the documents provided, a judge sided with Jacobson, after which the ICSD was ordered to release the video of the event. That video included one of the speakers saying to the children, "You can defend us, you can be freedom fighters for Palestine, you can bring peace;" a child is also heard saying, "When I grow up, I'm going to go to Palestine and protest."

YouTube 

On January 13, 2017, Jacobson's YouTube channel was taken down, with YouTube citing copyright violations. However, Jacobson stated that he was targeted for his conservative political views. His channel was restored on January 15, 2017.

Race 
In 2020, Jacobson authored two articles that criticized the history of Black Lives Matter. Jacobson described Black Lives Matter's founders as "anti-American, anti-capitalist activists, who want to destroy capitalism, in an act of revenge." This caused controversy and Cornell Law School students called for action against him.

In February 2021, Jacobson launched the website CriticalRace.org, a database listing the training activities and actions of college administrations pertaining to critical race training and anti-racism initiatives.

Federal COVID-19 lawsuit 
In January 2022, Jacobson filed a federal class-action lawsuit against Mary T. Bassett, then Acting Commissioner of the New York Department of Health, challenging the constitutionality of state health department that considers race as a risk factor in the distribution of COVID-19 treatments. The lawsuit argues the department directive is "patently unconstitutional" because it uses racial preferences in determining whether someone qualifies to receive them, which according to the lawsuit would violate the Fourteenth Amendment, the Civil Rights Act and other federal statutes.

Awards
 Blogger of the Year, Conservative Political Action Conference Red Carpet Bloggers Awards, March 2014.

References

External links
 Legal Insurrection

Harvard Law School alumni
American legal scholars
Critics of Black Lives Matter
Hamilton College (New York) alumni
Cornell Law School faculty
American legal websites
Living people
Year of birth missing (living people)